184th Division or 184th Infantry Division may refer to:

 184th Division (People's Republic of China)
 Italian 184th Airborne Division
 184th Rifle Division (Soviet Union)